The Landmark is the third collaborative studio album by American rapper Awol One and Canadian producer Factor. It was released on Fake Four Inc. in 2011.

Critical reception
Matthew Fiander of PopMatters gave the album 5 stars out of 10, saying, "More so than any of his other records, The Landmark makes Awol One's laid-back gruffness feel like a crafted persona, one whose elements don't quite work together." Bailey Pennick of East Bay Express said, "The twelve-track journey into Awol One's lyrical stream of consciousness results in a relatively boring listening experience."

Track listing

References

External links
 

2011 albums
Collaborative albums
Fake Four Inc. albums
Awol One albums
Albums produced by Factor (producer)